The London League was a football competition that was held in the London and surrounding areas of south-east England from 1896 until 1964.

In 1896 the president of the London League was Arnold Hills founder of Thames Ironworks F.C. (which later reformed as West Ham United). One of the men who helped draft the rules of the competition was Francis Payne, club secretary of Thames Ironworks F.C. in 1897. The league started with three divisions, the 3rd Grenadier Guards winning the inaugural championship.

The league fluctuated between having a single division and reaching four divisions. Before World War I, most of the senior London Football League clubs fielded a reserve side in the London League.

In 1964, the London League ceased to exist, merging with the Aetolian League to form the Greater London League, which then further merged in 1971 with the Metropolitan League to form the Metropolitan–London League. This later merged into the Spartan League, which in turn merged into the modern Spartan South Midlands League.

Champions

London League Division One
1896–1897 – 3rd Grenadier Guards
1897–1898 – Thames Ironworks
1898–1899 – Tottenham Hotspur Reserves
1899–1901 – Millwall Athletic Reserves
1901–1902 – West Ham United
1902–1903 – Tottenham Hotspur
1903–1904 – Woolwich Arsenal Reserves
1904–1905 – Southall
1908–1909 – Brentford Reserves

London League Division Two
1896–1897 – Bromley 
1897–1898 – Barnet
1898–1899 – Monsteds Athletic F.C.
1899–1900 – Fulham
1900–1901 – Airdrieonians
1901–1902 – East Greenwich Gas Works F.C.
1902–1903 – Brentford Reserves
1903–1904 – Catford Southend
1904–1905 – Clapton Orient Reserves
1911/1912 - Peel institute

London League Premier Division
1901–1902 – West Ham United
1902–1903 – Tottenham Hotspur                                                            
1903–1904 – Millwall
1908–1909 – West Ham United

London League Division One A
1909–1910 – Barking

In 1920, a third division, known as Division Two was added

In 1924, Division Two was disbanded

In 1939, the league was suspended due to the outbreak of World War II. On the resumption of football after the War, nineteen clubs played in the London League, split into Western and Eastern Divisions. Eastern Division champions Woolwich Polytechnic beat Eastern Champions Edgware Town 2–1 in a play-off

In 1946, the divisions were re-organised, and a new structure of a  Premier Division and a Division One was formed

Within 12 months, enough clubs had joined to form a new Division Two

In 1953, Division Two was disbanded

In 1956, Division One was disbanded, leaving only a single Senior section

In 1963, an increase in the number of clubs led to a reversion to two divisions.

Member clubs

1st Grenadier Guards (1903–04)
21st Lancers (1905–06)
2nd Grenadier Guards (1897–98, 1913–14
2nd Life Guards (1897–98)
3rd Grenadier Guards (1896–1898)
Acton Reserves (1933–1935)
Acton United and Aldine (1907–08)
Algernon Athletic (1921–1924)
Amersham Town (1961–62)
Arlesey Town (1958–1960)
Arsenal (1901–1904)
Arsenal Reserves (1900–1915)
Artillery College (1921–22)
Aveley (1949–1957)
Aveley Reserves (1951–52)
Aylesford Paper Mills (1951–1954)
Aylesford Paper Mills Reserves (1951–1953)
Baldock Town (1959–1963)
Barking (1909–1923)
Barking Reserves (1913–1926)
Barking Woodville (1896–1898)
Barking Woodville Reserves (1896–97)
Barkingside (1950–1964)
Barkingside Reserves (1963–64)
Barnet (1897–1900)
Barnet Avenue (1905–1907)
Barnet Alston (1904–1912)
Barnet Reserves (1923–1926)
Basildon Town (1955–1959)
Bata Sports (1949–1956)
Bata Sports Reserves (1950–1953)
Beckenham Town (1923–1935, 1951–1961)
Beckenham Town Reserves (1923–24, 1929–30, 1951–1953)
Bedford Town Reserves (1946–1951)
Belvedere (1920–1922)
Bexleyheath Labour (1920–21)
Bexleyheath Town (1924–1926)
Blackwall and Thames Ironworks (1920–1922)
Bletchley United (1959–1961)
Boleyn Castle (1903–04)
Bostall Athletic (1925–1927)
Bostall Heath (1921–1939)
Branbys Ironworks (1911–1913)
Brentford (1896–1904)
Brentford Reserves (1900–1913)
Brentwood & Warley Reserves (1947–1951)
Brentwood Mental Hospital (1926–1931)
Briggs Sports Reserves (1935–1951)
Brimsdown (1907–1910)
British Legion (1923–24)
Brittania (1946–47)
Bromley (1896–1901)
Bromley Old Boys (1921–22)
Bromley Reserves (1924–1926)
Bronze Athletic (1909–1914)
Brymay Athletic (1920–1923)
Burberry (1922–23)
Bush Hill Park (1922–1924)
Callender Athletic
Canvey Island
Carshalton Athletic
Catford Southend
Catford Southend Reserves
CAV Athletic
Chadwell Heath
Chalfont National
Chalfont St Peter
Charlton Albion
Charlton Athletic
Charlton Athletic Reserves
Chelmsford
Chelmsford City Reserves
Chelsea Reserves
Cheshunt
Cheshunt Reserves
Childs Hill Imperial
Chingford
Chingford Reserves
Chingford Town Reserves
Chingford United
Chiswick Town
Chiswick Town Reserves
City of Westminster
Clapham Reserves
Clapton Orient
Clapton Orient Reserves
Commercial Athletic
Commercial Gas
Covent Garden
Cray Wanderers
Crittall Athletic
Crittall Athletic Reserves
Crouch End
Crouch End Reserves
Croydon Common Reserves
Crystal Palace Reserves
Custom House
Custom House Reserves
CWS Silvertown
Dagenham British Legion
Dagenham British Legion Reserves
Dagenham Cables
Dagenham Park
Dagenham Town
Dagenham Town Reserves
Dartford Reserves
De Havilland
De Havilland Vampires
Depot RHA
Deptford Invicta
Deptford Town
Derrick Wanderers
Downshall
Earlsfield Town
East Greenwich Gas
East Ham United
Edgware Town
Edmonton
Edmonton Borough
Edmonton Borough Reserves
Ekco
Ekco Reserves
Eltham
Enfield
Enfield Cables
Enfield Reserves
Epping Town
Epping Town Reserves
Epsom
Epsom Reserves
Epsom Town
Epsom Town Reserves
Erith & Belvedere
Erith & Belvedere Reserves
Eton Manor
Eton Manor 'A'
Eton Manor Reserves
Eton Mission
Excelsior
Felstead
Finchley
Finchley Reserves
Ford Sports
Ford Sports Reserves
Forest Swifts
Fulham
Fulham 'A'
Fulham Reserves
Fulham St Andrew's
Gnome Athletic
Gravesend & Northfleet Reserves
Grays Athletic
Grays Athletic Reserves
Grays Town
Great Northern Railway
Great Western Railway
Guildford City Reserves
Guildhall
Gwynnes Athletic
Hammersmith Athletic
Hampstead Town
Hampstead Town Reserves
Hanwell
Hanwell Town
Harlesden Town
Harlow Town
Harold Hill
Harris Lebus
Harris Lebus Reserves
Harrow Athletic
Harrow United
Harrow Weald
Harrow Weald Reserves
Hastings United Reserves
Hatfield Town
Hatfield Town Reserves
Hayesco Sports
Hays Wharf
Hendon
Hendon Reserves
Hendon Town
Hermes
Hermes Reserves
Highfield
HMSO Press
Holland Athletic
Hotel Cecil
Hounslow
Ideal Wanderers
Ilford
Ilford Electrical
Ilford Reserves
Imperial
Islington Town
Jurgens (Purfleet)
Jurgens (Purfleet) Reserves
Kilburn
Kingston
Lathol Athletic
Lea Bridge Gas
Leavesden
Leavesden Hospital
Leyton
Leyton Reserves
Livesey United
London Generals
London Labour
London Telecoms
London Transport
London Transport Buses
London Transport Reserves
London Welsh
Lower Clapton
Lower Clapton Imperial
Merton Town
Metrogas
Metrogas Reserves
Metropolitan Police Reserves
Metropolitan Railway
Millwall
Millwall Reserves
Millwall United
Mitcham Wanderers
Mitcham Wanderers Reserves
Monsteads Athletic
Neasden
New Barnet
New Malden
North Woolwich
North Woolwich Invicta
Northern Polytechnic
Northern Polytechnic Reserves
Northmet
Norwood Association
Novocastrians
Nunhead Reserves
Old Aloysians
Old Charlton
Old Ignatians
Old Tottonians
Orient (old)
Orpington
Page Green Old Boys
Park Royal
Park Royal Reserves
Parkhill (Chingford)
Pearl Assurance
Peel Institute
Perrycobow
Perrycobow Reserves
Pinner
Pitsea United
PO Telecoms
Ponders End United
Port of London Authority
Port of London Authority Police
Post Office Engineers
Post Office Engineers Reserves
Queens Park Rangers
Queens Park Rangers Reserves
RAF Kidbrooke
Rainham Town
Rainham Town Reserves
Ravenscourt Amateurs
Redhill
RFA Record Office
RNVR
Roehampton
ROF Sports
Rolenmill
Romford
Romford Reserves
Romford Town
Royal Naval Depot (Chatham)
Royal Ordnance Factories
Ruislip Manor
Ruislip Manor Reserves
Savoy Hotel
Seven Kings
Shepherd's Bush
Shepherd's Bush Reserves
Siemens Sports
Slade Green Athletic
Slade Green Athletic Reserves
Snaresbrook United
South West Ham
Southall
Southall Reserves
Southern United
Standard Telephones
Stanley
Stanmore
Stansted
STD Athletic
Sterling Athletic
Stonebridge Park
Stones Athletic
Storey Athletic
Storey Athletic Reserves
Streatham Town
Streatham Town Reserves
Summerstown
Summerstown Reserves
Tate Institute
Telcon Athletic
Temple Mills
Tilbury
Tilbury Reserves
Tillings Athletic
Tonbridge Reserves
Tooting and Mitcham United
Tooting and Mitcham United Reserves
Tooting Town
Tottenham Hotspur
Tottenham Hotspur Reserves
Transport Workers
Tufnell Park (1907–1914)
Tunbridge Wells Rangers (1963–64)
UGBM Sports  (1929–1952)
Ulysses
Ulysses Reserves
University
Uxbridge
Uxbridge Reserves
Vampires
Van Den Bergh
Venner Sports
Vickers Armstrong
Vickers Armstrong Reserves
Wall End United (1920–1923)
Waltham (1906–1910)
Walthamstow Avenue (1901–02)
Walthamstow Borough (1926–27)
Walthamstow Grange (1906–1930)
Walthamstow Holborn (1898–1900)

Walthamstow Town Reserves (1923–24)
Walton & Hersham Reserves (1945–46)
Walton-on-Thames (1937–1939)
Walton-on-Thames Reserves (1938–1939)
Wandgas Athletic (1936–1939)
Wandsworth (1900–1903)
Wandsworth United (1937–1939)
Wapping Sports (1950–56)
Waterlows (1920–21)
Watney Sports (1929–30)
Wealdstone (1911–1922)
Welwyn Garden City (1951–1955)
Welwyn Garden City Reserves (1951–52)
West Croydon (1896–98)
West Ham United (1896–1898, 1899–1900, 1901–1904)
West Ham United Reserves (1900–1915)
West Hampstead (1897–1899, 1904–05, 1907–1910)
West London Old Boys (1910–1914)
West Norwood (1900–01, 1910–1913, 1923–24, 1936–37)
West Thurrock Athletic (1947–1964)
West Thurrock Athletic Reserves (1952–53)
Whyteleafe Albion (1929–1931)
Willesden (1957–1959)
Willesden Green (1899–1900)
Willesden Town (1898–99)
Willesden Town Reserves (1904–05)
Wingate (1952–1962)
Wingate Reserves (1952–53)
Wood Green Town (1909–1913)
Woodford (1909–10)
Woodford Town (1945–1951)
Woodford Town Reserves (1946–1951)
Woolwich (1913–14, 1927–28)
Woolwich Ordnance (1919–1921)
Woolwich Polytechnic (1901–1905, 1924–1964)
Wren Athletic (1922–1924)

References

 
Football competitions in London
Defunct football leagues in England